Syed Rayhān ad-Dīn was a medieval Sufi author of Bengal. His work gained recognition at the imperial court of Delhi, where he gained the nickname Bulbul-e-Bangālah (Nightingale of Bengal).

Biography
Syed Rayhan ad-Din was born into the Bengali Muslim Syed family of Taraf, in the village of Poil. The family was founded by Syed Nasiruddin, a 14th-century military commander who led the Muslim conquest of Taraf. As a result, Taraf had been transformed to a renowned centre of Islamic education in the subcontinent during the medieval period.

Rayhan wrote in the Persian language, and among his prominent works is Khawābnāma (خوابنامه). He also wrote his own version of the Masnavī-e-Gul-e-Bakāwalī (مثنوى گل بکاولی).

See also
Syed Shah Israil, another Persian-language writer

References

People from Habiganj Sadar Upazila
Bengali writers
Medieval Persian-language writers
Indian male writers
Indian Muslims
Year of birth unknown
Year of death unknown